Jean-Marc Varaut (18 February 1933 – 26 May 2005) was a French lawyer.

He was the lawyer of Maurice Papon, a member of Phillipe Petains Vichy government and he collaborated with the Nazis in the deportation of Jews in the Gironde region.

1933 births
2005 deaths
People from Neuilly-sur-Seine
20th-century French lawyers
Members of the Académie des sciences morales et politiques
People affiliated with Action Française
Deaths from cancer in France